WHPW-LP (97.3 FM) is a radio station licensed to serve the community of Harpswell, Maine. The station is owned by Harpswell Radio Project, Inc. It airs a variety format.

The station was assigned the WHPW-LP call letters by the Federal Communications Commission on April 22, 2014.

References

External links
 Official Website
 

HPW-LP
HPW-LP
Radio stations established in 2017
2017 establishments in Maine
Variety radio stations in the United States
Cumberland County, Maine
Harpswell, Maine